Coleophora lurida is a moth of the family Coleophoridae. It is found in Mongolia.

References

lurida
Moths of Asia